Simon Fletcher may refer to:

Simon Fletcher (American football) (born 1962), American football linebacker 
Simon Fletcher (artist), English artist
Simon Fletcher (Australian footballer) (born 1978), Australian rules footballer
Simon Fletcher (music manager) (born 1964), British music manager
Simon Fletcher (political advisor), London based